Edward Friedman (born 24 June 1999), known professionally as Teddy Edwards, is an American singer, songwriter, producer, musician, multi-instrumentalist, and record producer.

Early life
Born in New York City, he began piano lessons in 2003 at four, followed by guitar, and has been writing songs since he was nine.

Early career

Debut single
Edwards released his debut single in 2016, "My Name", which he co-wrote in 2014 with Sabrina Teitelbaum and was produced in 2015 by Phredley Brown. The music video for “My Name,” directed by Chris Zino premiered on January 19, 2017.

In 2016, Edwards began work on his forthcoming LP with revered mix engineer Andrew Wuepper, known for his work with Frank Ocean, Rihanna, and Justin Bieber. Edwards has co-produced with leading producers such as The Agency: consisting of Mike Molina and Nelson Kyle who have credited works with artists such as Nas, 2 Chainz, Young Thug, Meek Mill, Ciara, and John Legend.

On June 16, 2017, Edwards released the first single off his debut studio album, "Always Be There", which he wrote and was co-produced with The Agency. The song received positive critical acclaim, and was labelled "a mellow pop affair" by Cailey Lindberg of Earmilk.

References

External links
Teddy Edwards Homepage

1999 births
Living people
American multi-instrumentalists
American male pop singers
American male singer-songwriters
Singers from New York City
21st-century American singers
21st-century American male singers
Singer-songwriters from New York (state)